The Tri-Service General Hospital (TSGH) is a medical center in Neihu District, Taipei, Taiwan. It is the teaching hospital of the National Defense Medical Center.

History 
The hospital was originally established in 1946 as 801 Army General Hospital. It was then has been renamed to Taiwan Army Hospital, Fifth Logistics General Hospital, First Army, Navy and Air Force General Hospital and First Army General Hospital. In July 1967, it was finally renamed as Tri-Service General Hospital.

Popular culture 
The Tingjhou branch of the medical center was used in the 2014 film Lucy.

See also 
 List of hospitals in Taiwan

References

External links 

National Defense Medical Center

1946 establishments in China
Hospital buildings completed in 1946
Hospitals established in 1946
Hospitals in Taipei
Military hospitals
Military of the Republic of China
Teaching hospitals in Taiwan